Adolphe Kégresse (1879, Héricourt, Haute-Saône - 1943) was a French military engineer who invented the half-track and dual clutch transmission.

Born at Héricourt, and educated in Montbéliard, he moved in 1905 to Saint Petersburg, Russia to work for the Russian Tsar Nicholas II.  To improve the mobility of the imperial car park, he invented the Kégresse track to modify normal motor vehicles into half-tracks. He was also a personal chauffeur of Tsar Nicholas II and the Head of the Mechanical Department of the Russian Imperial Garage at Tsarskoye Selo. The Aide-de-camp to Tsar Nicholas II, Prince Orlov wrote in a letter to the Tsar's Minister of the Court on May 15, 1914:

"... I consider Kégresse an irreplaceable worker and I am afraid his leaving will be a great loss for the garage. Your Highness knows, of course, how much His Majesty appreciates Kégresse."

In 1908, the architect Lipsky VA designed a second two-storeyed Art Nouveau building for the Russian Imperial garage at Tsaskoye Selo / Pushkin, Saint Petersburg it had a total area of 367.6 sq. M. It housed the garage-residence Adolphe Kégresse. The building is noteworthy and identifiable for inclusion of a grand staircase with an external bas-relief image of one of the first car races held regularly in Tsarskoe Selo before the First World War.

After World War I Kégresse was forced to return to his home country, where he was from 1919 employed by the Citroën company during the 1920s and 1930s to design half-track vehicles, together with engineer Jacques Hinstin.

After leaving the Citroën company he developed in 1935 the AutoServe gearbox-transmission system. In 1939 he pioneered the development of modern small guided tracked bombs.  Kégresse died in 1943 at Croissy-sur-Seine.

Gallery

See also
Kégresse track
AMC Schneider P 16
SOMUA MCG

References

Informationen über Leben und Werk von Adolphe Kégresse (German language)
Information concerning the Tsar Nicholas II garage at Pushkin and A. Kégresse as Head of the Mechanical Department

1879 births
1943 deaths
People from Héricourt, Haute-Saône
French military engineers
20th-century French engineers
20th-century  French inventors
French expatriates in Russia